EEE may refer to:

Business
 Electronic Equipment Engineering, a defunct American trade magazine
 Embrace, extend and extinguish, an anti-competitive Microsoft business strategy
 Coca-Cola Hellenic Bottling Company (trades as EEE)
Union of Greek Shipowners

Computing 
 Asus Eee, a family of computer products
 Energy-Efficient Ethernet, a standard by the IEEE 802.3az group
 Embrace, extend, and extinguish, a phrase found by the US Department of Justice in use internally by Microsoft for its business strategy.

Science and medicine 
 EEE (psychedelic), a drug
 Eastern equine encephalitis (EEE), also referred to as 'Triple E'
 Earthquake environmental effects

Other uses
 E language, spoken in China
 Electronic and electrical engineering
 National Union of Greece, a defunct political party in Greece
 Triple-E Senate, a proposal for restructuring the Senate of Canada
 EEE, a width or girth in shoe size
EEE, the production code for the 1971 Doctor Who serial Terror of the Autons

See also
 3E (disambiguation)
 E3 (disambiguation)
 EE (disambiguation)
 Triple E (disambiguation)